The 4th Arkansas Cavalry Regiment was a cavalry regiment of the Confederate States Army from the state of Arkansas during the American Civil War. The regiment was designated at various times as Carroll's Regiment Arkansas Cavalry, Thompson's Regiment Arkansas Cavalry, and Gordon's Regiment Arkansas Cavalry. During the same time it was also known as 1st Regiment Arkansas Cavalry, 2nd Regiment Arkansas Cavalry, 9th Regiment Arkansas Cavalry and the 11th Regiment Arkansas Cavalry.

Organization
The 4th Arkansas Cavalry was mustered into Confederate service at Camp Massard, Arkansas, on July 11, 1862, for three years or the war. The unit was composed of volunteer companies from the following counties:

 Company A, of Madison County
 Company B, Originally commanded by Captain (later Colonel) Anderson Gordon, from Conway County, enlisted at Lewisburg, Arkansas, on June 14, 1862.
 Company C, of Yell County
 Company D, of Johnson County
 Company E, of Pope County
 Company F, of Washington County
 Company G, of Benton County
 Company H, of Benton County (Contains many former members of the 10th Regiment Arkansas Militia)
 Company I, of Sebastian County
 Company K, of Franklin County

Service
4th Arkansas Cavalry Regiment served in General Cabell's Brigade, Trans-Mississippi Department, and took an active part in the Camden Expedition and during the Battle of Marks' Mills, twenty-one percent of the 117 engaged were disabled. Later it participated in Price's Missouri Expedition and reported 106 casualties. The unit participated in the following engagements:
Devil’s Backbone, AR 1 Sep 1863
Pine Bluff, AR 25 Oct 1863
Camden Expedition March–May 1864
Elkin’s Ferry, AR 3 Apr 1864
Near Prairie D’Ane, AR 8 Apr 1864
Prairie D’Ane, AR 9–12 April 1864
Poison Springs, AR 18 April 1864
Camden, AR 20 Apr 1864
Marks' Mill, AR 25 April 1864 (4 k, 15 w)
Dardanelle, AR 16 May 1864
Pine Bluff, AR 30 July 1864
Price's Missouri Raid September–October 1864
Lewisburg, AR 7 September 1864
Glass Village, AR 8 September 1864
Arcadia, MO 27 September 1864
Pilot Knob, MO 27 September 1864
Franklin, MO 1 October 1864
Moreau Bottom, MO 7 October 1864
California, MO 9 October 1864
Booneville, MO 11–12 October 1864
Lexington, MO 18 October 1864
Little Blue River, MO 21 October 1864
Independence, MO 22 October 1864
Westport, MO 23 October 1864
Marais des Cygnes, KS 25 October 1864
Fayetteville, AR 2 November 1864

Surrender
During the spring of 1865 the 4th Arkansas Cavalry Regiment disbanded.

See also

 List of Arkansas Civil War Confederate units
 Arkansas in the American Civil War
 Arkansas Militia in the Civil War

References

External links
 Edward G. Gerdes Civil War Home Page
 Encyclopedia of Arkansas History and Culture
 The War of the Rebellion: a Compilation of the Official Records of the Union and Confederate Armies
 The Arkansas History Commission, State Archives, Civil War in Arkansas

Units and formations of the Confederate States Army from Arkansas
1865 disestablishments in Arkansas
Military units and formations disestablished in 1865
Military units and formations in Arkansas
Military in Arkansas
1861 establishments in Arkansas
Military units and formations established in 1861